Mourning and Melancholia is a 1917 work of Sigmund Freud, the founder of psychoanalysis.

In mourning, a person deals with the grief of losing of a specific love object, and this process takes place in the conscious mind. In melancholia, a person grieves for a loss they are unable to fully comprehend or identify, and thus this process takes place in the unconscious mind. Mourning is considered a healthy and natural process of grieving a loss, while melancholia is considered pathological.

It has been argued by some writers that Freud's description of mourning in this work is not compatible with current models of mourning.

References 

Essays by Sigmund Freud
1917 documents
German-language books